South Carolina Highway 18 Connector may refer to:

South Carolina Highway 18 Connector (Gaffney)
South Carolina Highway 18 Connector (Union)

018 Connector
018 Connector